Leshnjë is a village and a former municipality in Berat County, central Albania. At the 2015 local government reform it became a subdivision of the municipality Skrapar. The population at the 2011 census was 496.

References

Former municipalities in Berat County
Administrative units of Skrapar
Villages in Berat County
Populated places disestablished in 2015